Roger Atkinson Pryor (July 19, 1828 – March 14, 1919) was a Virginian newspaper editor and politician who became known for his fiery oratory in favor of secession; he was elected both to national and Confederate office, and served as a general for the Confederate Army during the American Civil War. In 1865 he moved to New York City to remake his life, and in 1868 brought up his family. He was among a number of influential southerners in the North who became known as "Confederate carpetbaggers."

He became a law partner with Benjamin F. Butler (based in Boston), noted in the South as a hated Union general during the war. Their partnership was financially successful, and Pryor became active in the Democratic Party in the North. In 1877 he was chosen to give a Decoration Day address, in which, according to one interpretation, he vilified Reconstruction and promoted the Lost Cause, while reconciling the noble soldiers as victims of politicians. In 1890 he joined the Sons of the American Revolution, one of the new heritage societies that was created following celebration of the United States Centennial.

He was appointed as judge of the New York Court of Common Pleas from 1890 to 1894, and justice of the New York Supreme Court from 1894 to his retirement in 1899.  On April 10, 1912, he was appointed official referee by the appellate division of the state Supreme Court, where he served until his death.

He and his wife Sara Agnes Rice Pryor, also a Virginian, had seven children together, the last born in 1868. Active in founding several heritage societies, she organized fundraising for historic preservation.  She was a writer and had several works: histories, memoirs, and novels, published by the Macmillan Company in the first decade of the twentieth century. Her memoirs have been important sources for historians doing research on southern society during and after the Civil War. One of their granddaughters, Mary Blair Rice, authored several books under the pen name of Blair Niles.

Early life and education
Pryor was born near Petersburg, Virginia, at Montrose as the second child of Lucy Atkinson and Theodorick Bland Pryor, the minister at Petersburg's Washington Street Presbyterian Church (after the Tabb Street Church built in 1844 became overcrowded). He had an older sister Lucy. His father was a grandson of Richard Bland and his paternal ancestors were descended from early Virginia colonists. After his mother died young, his father remarried and had several children with his second wife.
Pryor graduated from Hampden–Sydney College in 1845 and from the law school of the University of Virginia in 1848.

The following year, he was admitted to the bar, but abandoned law on account of ill health. He started working as a journalist before his marriage.

Marriage and family
On November 8, 1848, Pryor married Sara Agnes Rice, daughter of Samuel Blair Rice and his second wife, Lucy Walton Leftwich, of Halifax County, Virginia. One of numerous children, she was effectively adopted by a childless aunt, Mary Blair Hargrave and her husband, Dr. Samuel Pleasants Hargrave, and lived with them in Hanover, Virginia.  They were slaveholders. When Sara was about eight, the Hargraves moved with her to Charlottesville for her education.

Sara and Roger A. Pryor had seven children together: 
Maria Gordon Pryor (called Gordon) (1850 - 1928), married Henry Crenshaw Rice (1842 - 1916) and had daughter Mary Blair Rice, who authored several books under the pen name of Blair Niles.
Theodorick Bland Pryor (1851 - 1871), died at the age of 20, likely a suicide, as he had been suffering from depression. Admitted to Princeton College at an early age, he was its first mathematical fellow; he also studied at Cambridge University, and had been studying law. 
Roger Atkinson Pryor, became a lawyer in New York.
Mary Blair Pryor, married Francis Thomas Walker and, as documented in *"Mary Blair Destiny". she had daughter Mary Blair Walker Zimmer  Buried in Princeton Cemetery.
William Rice Pryor (b. c.1860 - 1900), became a physician and surgeon in New York and died young.
Lucy Atkinson Pryor, married the architect A. Page Brown; in 1889 they moved to San Francisco, California.
Francesca (Fanny) Theodora Bland Pryor (b. 31 December 1868), Petersburg, VA, married William de Leftwich Dodge, a painter; they lived in Paris and New York.

Roger and Sara Pryor's great-great-great-granddaughter is Erin Richman, author of *"Mary Blair Destiny".

Career

For a few years, Pryor worked at journalism, serving on the editorial staffs of the Washington Union in 1852 and the Daily Richmond Enquirer in 1854. The latter was one of the leading papers in the South for 50 years.

After getting involved in politics, Pryor was appointed by President Franklin Pierce as a diplomat to Greece in 1854.  Upon his return to Virginia, in 1857 he established The South, a daily newspaper in Richmond.  He became known as a fiery and eloquent advocate of slavery, southern states' rights, and secession; although he and his wife did not personally own slaves, they came from the slaveholding class. His advocacy of the institution was an example of how, in a "slave society" like Virginia, slavery both powered the economy and underlay the entire social framework.

In 1859, Pryor was elected as a Democrat to the U.S. House of Representatives; he filled the vacancy in Virginia's 4th District caused by the death of William O. Goode. He served from December 7, 1859, and was re-elected, serving to March 3, 1861, when the state seceded. In the House, Pryor became a particular enemy of Representative Thaddeus Stevens, a Republican from Pennsylvania in favor of abolitionism.

During his term, Pryor got into a fierce argument with John F. Potter, a representative from Wisconsin, and challenged him to a duel. Having the choice of weapons according to duel protocol, Potter chose bowie knives. Pryor backed out, saying that the knife was not a "civilized weapon." The incident was widely publicized in the Northern press, which portrayed Pryor's refusal to duel as a coup for the North — and as a cowardly humiliation of a Southern "fire eater".

During an anti-slavery speech by Illinois Republican (and cousin) Owen Lovejoy on the floor of the U.S. House of Representatives on April 5, 1860, Lovejoy condemned the Democrats for their racist views and support of slavery. As Lovejoy gave his speech, Pryor and several other Democrats in the audience, grew irate and incensed over Lovejoy's remarks and threatened him with physical harm, with several Republicans rushing to Lovejoy's defense.

American Civil War
In early 1861, Pryor agitated for immediate secession in Virginia, but the state convention did not act. He went to Charleston in April, to urge an immediate attack on Fort Sumter. (Pryor asserted this would cause Virginia to secede.) On April 12, he and Sara accompanied the last Confederate party to the fort before the bombardment (but stayed in the boat). Afterward, while waiting at Fort Johnson, he was offered the opportunity to fire the first shot. But he declined, saying, "I could not fire the first gun of the war." Pryor almost became the first casualty of the Civil War - while visiting Fort Sumter as an emissary, he assumed a bottle of potassium iodide in the hospital was medicinal whiskey and drank it; his mistake was realized in time for Union doctors to pump his stomach and save his life.

In 1861, Pryor was re-elected to his Congressional seat, but, Virginia declaring secession meant he never took his seat. (In this period, several states including Virginia elected U.S. Representatives in the early part of odd years. In that period, Congress generally met late in the year.) He served in the provisional Confederate Congress in 1861, and also in the first regular Congress (1862) under the Confederate Constitution.

He entered the Confederate army as colonel of the 3rd Virginia Infantry Regiment. He was promoted to brigadier general on April 16, 1862. His brigade fought in the Peninsula Campaign and at Second Manassas, where it became detached in the swirling fighting and temporarily operated under Stonewall Jackson. Pryor's command initially consisted of the 2nd Florida, 14th Alabama, 3rd Virginia, and 14th Louisiana. During the Seven Days Battles, the 1st (Coppens') Louisiana Zouave Battalion was temporarily attached to it. Afterwards, the Louisianans departed and Pryor received two brand-new regiments; the 5th and 8th Florida Infantry. As a consequence, it became known as "The Florida Brigade". At Antietam on September 17, 1862, he assumed command of Anderson's Division in Longstreet's Corps when Maj. Gen. Richard H. Anderson was wounded. Pryor proved inept as a division commander, and Union troops flanked his position, causing them to fall back in disorder.

As a result, he did not gain a permanent higher field command from the Confederate president. Following his adequate performance at the Battle of Deserted House, later in 1863 Pryor resigned his commission and his brigade was broken up, its regiments being reassigned to other commands. In August of that year, he enlisted as a private and scout in the 3rd Virginia Cavalry Regiment under General Fitzhugh Lee. Pryor was captured on November 28, 1864, and confined in Fort Lafayette in New York as a suspected spy. After several months, he was released on parole by order of President Lincoln and returned to Virginia. CSA War Clerk and diarist, John B. Jones, mentioned Pryor in his April 9, 1865, entry from Richmond, VA, "Roger A. Pryor is said to have remained voluntarily in Petersburg, and announces his abandonment of the Confederate States cause."

In the early days of the war, Sara Rice Pryor accompanied her husband and worked as a nurse for the troops.  In 1863 after he resigned his commission, she stayed in Petersburg and struggled to hold their family together, likely with the help of relatives.  She later wrote about the war years in her two memoirs published in the early 1900s.

Postbellum activities
In 1865, an impoverished Pryor moved to New York City, invited by friends he had known before the war. He eventually established a law firm with the politician Benjamin F. Butler of Boston. Butler had been a Union general who was widely known and hated in the South. Pryor became active in Democratic politics in New York.

Pryor brought his family from Virginia to New York in 1868, and they settled in Brooklyn Heights. They struggled with poverty for years but gradually began to get re-established.

Pryor learned to operate in New York Democratic Party politics, where he was prominent among influential southerners who became known as "Confederate carpetbaggers."   Eventually he gave speeches saying that he was glad that the nation had reunited and that the South had lost.  Pryor was elected as a delegate to the Democratic National Convention in 1876, a year before the federal government pulled its last military forces out of the South and ended Reconstruction.

Chosen by the Democratic Party for the important Decoration Day address in 1877, after the national compromise that resulted in the federal government pulling its troops out of the South, Pryor vilified Reconstruction and promoted the Lost Cause.  He referred to all the soldiers as noble victims of politicians, although he had been one who gave fiery speeches in favor of secession and war. Historian David W. Blight has written that Pryor was one of a number of influential politicians who shaped the story of the war as excluding the issue of slavery; in the following years, the increasing reconciliation between the North and South was based on excluding freedmen and the issues of race.

In 1890, Pryor was appointed as judge of the New York Court of Common Pleas, where he served until 1894.  He was next appointed as justice of the New York Supreme Court, serving from 1894 to 1899, when he retired.

In December 1890, Pryor joined the New York chapter of the new heritage/lineage organization, Sons of the American Revolution (SAR), for male descendants of participants in the war. When admitted, he and his documented ancestors were all entered under his membership number of 4043.  Annoyed at being excluded from the men's club, Sara Agnes Rice Pryor and other women founded chapters of the Daughters of the American Revolution, setting up their own lineage society to recognize women's contributions and organize for historic preservation and education.

In retirement, Pryor was appointed on April 10, 1912, as official referee by the appellate division of the New York State Supreme Court.

He served until his death on March 14, 1919, in New York City. He was buried in Princeton Cemetery, in Princeton, New Jersey., where his wife and their sons Theodorick and William had already been buried. His daughter, Mary Blair Pryor Walker, was also buried near him after her death.

Legacy and honors
A Virginia highway marker honors Pryor's birthplace near Petersburg, Virginia.

Sara Agnes Rice Pryor

Sara Pryor shared her husband's struggles during their early years of poverty in New York. She sewed all the children's clothes, gained school scholarships, and helped her husband with his law studies. Realizing that other women and children needed help, she raised money to found a home for them.

Like her husband, Sarah Pryor helped found lineage and heritage organizations, including Preservation of the Virginia Antiquities (since 2009 named Preservation Virginia); the Mary Washington Memorial Association; the Daughters of the American Revolution (DAR); and the National Society of the Colonial Dames of America.  She became a productive writer, after 1900 publishing two histories on the colonial era, two memoirs and novels. Her Reminiscences of Peace and War (1904), was recommended by the United Daughters of the Confederacy to its membership for serious study.

Personal life
Pryor was a descendant of Richard Bland II, Richard Bland I, Theodorick Bland of Westover, and Governor Richard Bennett

See also

List of American Civil War generals (Confederate)

Notes

References
Eicher, John H., and David J. Eicher, Civil War High Commands. Stanford: Stanford University Press, 2001. .
Eicher, David J. The Longest Night: A Military History of the Civil War. New York: Simon & Schuster, 2001. .
James, Edward T., James, Janet Wilson, Boyer, Paul S.; Notable American Women, 1607–1950: A Biographical Dictionary, Harvard University Press, (1971) 
 Retrieved on 2008-02-13
Pryor, Roger A. "Essays and Addresses". New York: Neale Pub. Co., 1912. .
Richman, Erin L. "Mary Blair Destiny". Two Goddesses Publishing, 2019. .
Scott, Henry Wilson, Ingalls, John James; Distinguished American Lawyers with Their Struggles and Triumphs in the Forum (1890)
Sifakis, Stewart. Who Was Who in the Civil War. New York: Facts On File, 1988. .
Sutherland, Daniel E. The Confederate Carpetbaggers. Baton Rouge: Louisiana State University Press, 1988. .
Warner, Ezra J. Generals in Gray: Lives of the Confederate Commanders. Baton Rouge: Louisiana State University Press, 1959. .
Waugh, John C.; Surviving the Confederacy: Rebellion, Ruin, and Recovery : Roger and Sara Pryor during the Civil War, Harcourt, (2002) 
Welsh, Jack D.; Medical Histories of Confederate Generals, Kent State University Press, (1999) 
Wilson, James Grant, Fiske, John; Appletons' Cyclopaedia of American Biography, D. Appleton, (1900)

Further reading
Sarah E. Gardner, Blood And Irony: Southern White Women's Narratives of the Civil War, 1861-1937, University of North Carolina Press, 2006
Holzman, Robert S. Adapt or Perish; The Life of General Roger A. Pryor, C.S.A., Hamden, Conn.: Archon Books, 1976.
Richman, Erin L. "Mary Blair Destiny", Two Goddesses Publishing, 2019.

External links
Virginia State Highway Memorial Marker
Mary Blair Destiny

1828 births
1919 deaths
Members of the Confederate House of Representatives from Virginia
Confederate States Army brigadier generals
19th-century American newspaper publishers (people)
American Civil War prisoners of war
Hampden–Sydney College alumni
Burials at Princeton Cemetery
University of Virginia School of Law alumni
Bland family of Virginia
New York (state) Democrats
Democratic Party members of the United States House of Representatives from Virginia
19th-century American politicians
People from Dinwiddie County, Virginia
American proslavery activists
People from Brooklyn Heights
American Fire-Eaters